TDK Corporation is a Japanese electronics manufacturer. TDK may also refer to:
 TDK Australian Audio Book Awards
 Team Dragon Knights, disbanded League of Legends team
TDK Electronics, German subsidiary of TDK Corporation
 Mark Knight (musician)
 The Dark Knight, 2008 superhero film directed by Christopher Nolan
 Turkish Language Association (Turkish: Türk Dil Kurumu or TDK), official authority
 TDK SC, a Japanese football team
 TDK - the IATA airport code for Taldykorgan Airport, Kazakhstan